Pittura infamante (Italian for "defaming portrait"; plural pitture infamanti) is a genre of defamatory painting and relief, common in Renaissance Italy in city-states in the north and center of the Italian Peninsula during the Trecento, Quattrocento, and Cinquecento. Popular subjects of pittura infamante include traitors, thieves, and those guilty of bankruptcy or public fraud, often in cases where no legal remedy was available. Commissioned by governments of city-states and displayed in public centers, pittura infamante were both a form of "municipal justice" (or "forensic art") and a medium for internal political struggles.According to Samuel Edgerton, the genre began to decline precisely when it came to be regarded as a form of art rather than effigy; the power of the genre derived from a feudal-based code of honor, where shame was one of the most significant social punishments. As such, pittura infamante has its roots in the doctrines of fama and infamia in ancient Roman law.

Display
Pitture infamanti could appear in any public place, but some places were more frequently adorned with them; for example, the first floor exterior of the Bargello (originally a barracks and prison, now an art museum) periodically contained numerous, life-size, pittura infamante frescoes. Florentine law required the Podestà have such caricatures painted, and accompanied by verbal identification of those held in contempt of court for financial offenses (bad debt, bankruptcy, fraud, forgery, etc.). Pitture infamanti were far more common in Republican Florence than in autocratic city states, whose rulers often deemed them to be sources of "disrepute."

Themes
Common themes of pittura infamante — which were meant to be humiliating — include depicting the subject as wearing a mitre or hanging upside down, being in the presence of unclean animals such as pigs or donkeys or those deemed evil like snakes; pittura infamante would also contain captions listing the offenses of the subject. Pittura infamante could originate as more favorable depictions, only to be transformed after the subject had fallen out of favor.

Imagery
Pittura infamante always depicted men and never women, and generally depicted upper-class men (who would have the most to lose from character assassination). The act of hanging itself was also significant, as affluent criminals would generally be afforded the privilege of beheading rather than hanging; hanging was also shameful in religious contexts (e.g. Judas). The topos of mundus inversus ("world upside down") is often associated with comedy and humiliation.

Famous artists who painted pitture infamanti frescoes include Andrea del Castagno, Sandro Botticelli, and Andrea del Sarto. There are no surviving examples of pitture infamanti frescoes, but contemporary sources suggest that they were brightly colored. Detailed descriptions of pitture infamanti in primary sources are rare. A very few preparatory drawings, however, are extant, and The Hanged Man from Tarot cards is thought to resemble the archetypal pittura infamante theme, as Tarot decks were first produced in northern Italy in the 1440s.

Records
Documentary evidence for pittura infamante outside Italy is rarer but existent. For example, records support the use of "very unpleasant pictures" painted on cloths during the Hundred Years' War and the reign of King Louis XI of France, and — later— in England and north Germany.

Pitture infamanti were the counterpoint of another contemporary form of secular, full-length portrait: uomini famosi ("famous men") or uomini illustri ("illustrious men"), which depicted figures from the Old Testament or Antiquity in a positive context, generally on the interior of private or civic buildings as moral exemplars.

Subjects of pittura infamante
Bologna

 Konrad von Landau, painted on the walls of Bologna for treachery; in response Landau created his own "pittura infamante" on the saddle of his horse, depicting the local politicians hung upside down by their feet in the hand of a giant whore.

Fermo

 Rinaldo da Monteverde, the papal governor of Fermo, "fell victim to humiliating popular justice" in the form of a pittura infamante.

Florence
Niccolò Piccinino, in the Palazzo della Signoria in 1428, which depicted him hanging upside-down in chains; "depaint[ed]" in April 1430. Hanging upside down by one foot was a common theme for pittura infamante of condottieri who switched sides.
The eight Pazzi conspirators, on the wall above the Dogana by Botticelli, commissioned by the Otto di Guardia in 1478; visible from the Sala dei Gigli until its removal in 1494.
Ridolfo di Camerino, "traitor to the Holy Mother Church, to the popolo and commune of Florence and to all its allies," painted upside down on a gallows, hanging by his left foot on the facade of the Army Pay Office with a siren on his left and a basilisk on his right while wearing a bishop's mitre (circa October 13, 1377).
Rodolfo II da Varano, who defected to the papacy during the War of the Eight Saints, depicted on a gallows attached to the neck of a devil.
Milan
Reliefs of Frederick Barbarossa and Beatrice of Burgundy set on the Porta Romana and Porta Tosa, Milan.

See also
The Allegory of Good and Bad Government
denunciation
graffiti

wanted poster

Notes

References
Antal, Frederick. 1947. Florentine Painting and Its Social Background. The Bourgeois Republic before Cosimo de' Medici's Advent to Power: Fourteenth and Early Fifteenth Centuries. Kegan Paul.
Caferro, William. 2006. John Hawkwood: An English Mercenary in Fourteenth Century Italy. Baltimore: Johns Hopkins University Press. 
Dean, Trevor. 2000. The Towns of Italy in the Later Middle Ages. Manchester University Press. 
Edgerton, Samuel Y. 1980. "Icons of Justice." Past and Present, 89: 23–38.
Edgerton, Samuel Y. 1985. Pictures and Punishment. Art and Criminal Prosecution during the Florentine Renaissance. Ithaca, New York: Cornell University Press.
Garberti, M. Preceruti. 1974. Il Castello Sforzesco. Le raccolte artistiche: Pittura e sculptura. Milan.
Gardner, Julian. 1987. "An Introduction to the Iconography of the Medieval Italian City Gate." Dumbarton Oaks Papers, 41: 199–213.
Hegarty, Melinda. 1996. "Laurentian Patronage in the Palazzo Vecchio: The Frescoes of the Sala dei Gigli." The Art Bulletin, 78(2): 265–285.
Hudson, Hugh. 2006. "The Politics of War: Paolo Uccello’s Equestrian Monument for Sir John Hawkwood in the Cathedral of Florence." Parergon 23: 1–33.
Mills, Robert. 2005. Suspended animation: pain, pleasure and punishment in medieval culture. Reaktion Books. 
Ortalli, Gherardo. 2015 [1979]. La pittura infamante. Secoli XIII-XVI. New edition. Rome: Viella. 
Wegener, Wendy J. 1993. "'That the practice of arms is most excellent declare the statues of valiant men': the Luccan War and Florentine Political ideology in paintings by Uccello and Castagno." Renaissance Studies 7(2): 129–167.
Wieruszowski, Helene. 1944. "Art and the Commune in the Time of Dante." Speculum, 19(1): 14–33.

Italian art movements
Caricature
Iconography
Political art
Visual arts genres
Punishments
Italian words and phrases